

Matches
Fixtures and results of the Myanmar National League 2022 season.

Week 1

Week 2

Week 3

Week 4

Week 5

Week 6

Week 7

Week 8

Week 9

Week 10

Week 11

Week 12

Week 13

Week 14

Week 15

Week 16

Week 17

Week 18

This is the statistics of 2022 Myanmar National League.

Season statistics

Top scorers
As of  20 Nov 2022.

Most assists
As of  15 Dec 2022.

Clean sheets
As of 20 Nov 2022.

References

Myanmar sport-related lists
Myanmar National League